Thomas Christoph Heyde (born 12 November 1973) is a German composer, media artist and curator. He is chairman of the Forum Zeitgenössischer Musik Leipzig.

Life 
Heyde was born in Leipzig in 1973 as the son of a pastor. From the age of seven he was trained on the piano and later received private composition lessons from Lorenz Stolzenbach. Without passing his Abitur he first completed a pharmaceutical education and worked as a nurse in a Leipzig hospital. Via a special test he studied musical composition with Peter Herrmann and electroacoustic music with Eckhard Rödger at the University of Music and Theatre Leipzig from 1994 on.

From 1998 to 2006 he taught the new media art at the Hochschule für Grafik und Buchkunst Leipzig and was head of the electronic studio there. From 2001 to 2002 he was organizer of the concert series Sende(r)musik of the Mitteldeutscher Rundfunk. (MDR). Since 2003 he is artistic director of the Forum Zeitgenössischer Musik Leipzig. FZML. He organized among others the international art and music project Cage100 (2012/13) and the transmediale project ABENDMAHL - "diminishing horror | increasing love". In WS 2012/13 he was a lecturer on John Cage and in WS 2016/17 on musical concepts after 1945 at the Institute of Musicology of the University of Leipzig.

He writes mainly orchestral and chamber music. His compositions have been broadcast by Deutschlandradio, Deutschlandfunk, MDR, Bayerischer Rundfunk, Westdeutscher Rundfunk and Swiss Radio. His special interests are live electronics and video art. Thus he worked together with Ulrich Polster. The resulting art videos have been shown in museums in France and Great Britain.

With the professor of linguistics  (University of Flensburg) he has two children. He is married to the psychologist and therapist Ina Habt.

Heyde is chairman of the board of Mosaik Leipzig e.V. The institution operates a migration consultancy service among others and a psychosocial centre for refugees.

Sound language 
The music journalist Dirk Wieschollek described Heyde as: "equally socialized with " classical music ", " new music " and " techno "". In the radio feuilleton of Deutschlandradio Kultur it was said: "He wants to inspire people for New Music who have little contact with high culture. Therefore he also has concerts played in very unusual places."

Awards 
 Scholarships of: Academy of Arts Berlin, German National Academic Foundation, Alfried Krupp von Bohlen und Halbach Foundation, 
 2001:  (shared price for composition)

Work

Withour electronics 
 Apparitionen I (1995/96) for trumpet solo
 Streichquartett Nr. 3 (1995) – 1. Version (1996/97) – 2. Version
 Charakteristische Studien für Klavier (1995/96)
 Drei „Lieder“ (1995/96) for baritone and piano
 Streichquartett Nr. 4 (1995/96)
 Rhythmica Moblié (1995) for four pianists at two pianos
 Appartments II (1995). Chamber music for 9 players
 Lamento ? (1996). Requiem for 3 instruments, 2 speakers and voice. Premiere Weimar 1997
 NO NAME (1997). A potpourri of awakening for ensemble. Premiere Berlin 1997
 mein fremdes Land (1998) for flute solo
 ENSEMBLE (1998) for prepared piano. Premiere Leipzig 1998
 vor mir entlang (1998) for four recorder players
 Apparitions V (1999) for solo violin
 Schwebung (1999) for two-manual harpsichord
 für S. (1999). Arie für Bariton und Kammerensemble (after a text by Jürgen Becker). Premiere Leipzig 1999
 rufen? nein, wollen! (1999) for Ensemble
 Ansichtennetz (2000) for English horn, bassoon, guitar and viola. First performance Leipzig 2001 (Music-Time-Autumn Festival, Ensemble Sortisatio)
 Schwarzfahrer-Marsch I/II (2007) for accordion, triolas and percussion
 Bälle und Felle (2008) for accordion and 3 percussionists

With electronics 
 Apparitionen III (1995/96) for solo violin, 4-channel playback tapes and live electronics. UA Leipzig 1996
 KULTUS (1996/97) for mezzo-soprano, chamber orchestra, chamber choir, live electronics and tape (with texts). First performance Leipzig 2000
 Appartments IV (1997/98). Audio pictures for oboe, 4-channel tape and live electronics (based on texts by Anna Akhmatova and Jurij Brězan). First performance Leipzig 1998
 ARENA (1998) for orchestra
 Umgang-Aufstieg-Abgang (1999) for flute, oboe, trumpet, percussion, live electronics and 4-channel tape
 Gewässer des Lichts (2000) for mezzo-soprano, small ensemble and tape (after a text by Johannes Bobrowski)
 Piano(s)-Chat (2000) for MIDI piano, computer and live electronics. first performance Leipzig
 Fernen (2001) for 3 recorders, 8-channel tape and live electronics. first performance Berlin
 Ich-ein Fremder (2001) for voice, chamber orchestra, 7.1 surround tape and live electronics (after texts by Miguel de Unamuno and Thomas Christoph Heyde). Premiere Dresden (Dresden Centre for Contemporary Music, Titus Engel (cond.))
 Confetti Parade mit Hardcore-Romantik (2002) for flute, electric guitar, video and electronics
 Apparitionen VI (2002) for bassoon, 2-channel tape and subwoofer
 Apparitionen VI (2002/05) for recorder, 2-channel tape recorder and subwoofer
 High-Culture-Motherfuckers (2002/03) for 4 percussionists and tape
 3xkurz 3xlang (2005/06) for ensemble, live-electronics and tape
 3xkurz 3xlang II (2007/08) for ensemble, live electronics and tape
 CH-GS1978 (2005/06) for 3 recorders, mobile video monitors and tape
 Frost (2004-07) for violoncello, electronics and video screens
 memory-faded (2006/07) for viola, piano and live electronics
 Fieldz (2006/07) for piano, 4 percussionists and electronics
 Death Is Not the End (2008) for organ, viola and electronics

Writings 
 Wege – Auswege – Umwege. Zu Situation, Strukturen und Inhalten der zeitgenössischen Musik. In Neue Musikzeitung 51 (2002) 2. (together with Péter Kőszeghy)
 Neue Musik ohne Festivals? In  52 (2002), . (along with Claus-Steffen Mahnkopf)
 FreiZeitArbeit. In Positionen 76 (2008), .
 B-A-C-H | C-A-G-E. Zwei Weltenordner, Leipzig und CAGE100. In Positionen 93 (2012).

Literature

Anthologies 
 Heyde, Thomas Christoph. In  (ed.): Komponisten der Gegenwart in Deutschen Komponistenverband: Ein Handbuch. 5th edition, ConBrio Verlags-Gesellschaft, Regensburg 2000, .
 Heyde, Thomas Christoph. In Axel Schniederjürgen (ed.): Kürschners Musiker-Handbuch. 5th edition, Saur Verlag, Munich 2006, .

 Interviews and conversations 
 Ronny Arnold: Zwischen Konzerthaus und Bordell. Der Komponist Thomas Christoph Heyde. Deutschlandradio Kultur, 11 March 2013.
 Thomas Buchholz: Das Neue an der Neuen Musik als hinterfragbare Größe. Ein "Mail-Wechsel" zwischen Prof. Thomas Buchholz und dem Komponisten Thomas C. Heyde. In the Neue Musikzeitung 51 (2002) 2.
 Stefan Reisner: Kein Feuerwerk abbrennen, sondern nachhaltig wirken. Ein Interview mit Thomas Chr. Heyde über die Cage-Interpretation im 21. Jahrhundert. In Neue Musikzeitung'' 61 (2012) 11.

References

External links 
 Offizielle Website von Thomas Christoph Heyde
 
 Literatur von Thomas Christoph Heyde in the Bibliography of Music Literature
 
 Thomas Christoph Heyde im Komponistenlexikon

1973 births
Living people
Musicians from Leipzig
20th-century classical composers
21st-century German composers
German electronic musicians
Dramaturges